KSYR (92.1 FM) is a terrestrial American radio station, licensed to Benton, Louisiana and serving Shreveport/Bossier City. The station airs a Contemporary Christian format.

Prior to being purchased by Coochie Brake Broadcasting, the station was in simulcast with KOYE and KCUL-FM as Regional Mexican formatted "La Invasora".

History
The station was formerly known as "The Buzz", created as an alternative rock addition to Shreveport, and competed mainly with local hard rock station, 99x.

The Buzz brought a refreshing new style of music to the area, featuring many bands that were not played on 99x or any other station. On Saturday nights, The Buzz was transformed into "Club Buzz," where all the songs played were techno-influenced remixes of the normal alternative songs that it played. The Buzz also featured a variety of interaction with listeners as well as original contests.  Weekly contests featured were The Free Buzz at 4:20, Thumbs Up or the Finger, The Buzz Rewind, and the short lived Buzz Bits, where listeners could call in and say whatever they wanted, within reason. Its Too Cool for Tool contest was also original, with each contestant sitting on a large tub of ice, and whoever lasting the longest receiving a pair of Tool concert tickets, along with a "Tool"-box full of Tool SWAG.

The Buzz came to an abrupt end in 2004, in circumstances where it was literally there one minute and gone the next. No reason was ever stated for the cancellation of the station, and the format was quickly switched to Christmas music until the start of the new year. Since The Buzz, the station has been a light rock station and its current format is Spanish radio.

KSYR started 95.7 which now contains the oldies format that was on this frequency.  On 95.7 it was first known as country.  Then in approximately 1997 it flipped to Star 95.7, an Adult Contemporary station claimed to sit in between the CHR of 94.5 and soft rock of 96.5.  It played hit music without the rap, sleepy music or hard rock trying to appeal to the core working audience.  However, it flipped to a rhythmic top 40 as Power 95.7.  The music selection mixed boy bands with the flourishing urban music scene putting it between KMJJ, KBTT and the more rock leaning top 40 at KRUF.  Ultimately in 2001 it became the Buzz and moved to its present frequency.

Former on-air personalities
 Flynt Stone (currently on KTAL-FM)
 Johnny Maze 
 Boner in the Morning (October 2001- September 2003)
 Drunk Mouth and Naked Jake (currently on KTUX)
 Bif Drysdale and Monkey Boy
 Rod the Human Tripod

External links
 

Radio stations in Louisiana
Radio stations established in 2000